Walter Favre (14 June 1931 – 9 April 1970) was a Swiss racing cyclist. He finished in last place in the 1958 Tour de France.

References

External links
 

1931 births
1970 deaths
Swiss male cyclists
Sportspeople from Basel-Stadt